BattleSphere is a first-person space combat simulation video game originally developed by 4Play and published by ScatoLOGIC exclusively for the Atari Jaguar on February 29, 2000.

Taking place in the future where seven races have colonized and destroyed multiple planets due to their actions, the leaders of each race send their best pilots into an inclosed region of space called BattleSphere to either gain privilege of occupy the remaining habitable stars or return to their original dying planets. Originally conceived in 1993 before the Jaguar was officially released to the market, BattleSphere is heavily influenced by multiple science fiction works and video games, most notably Star Raiders.

Initially released in 2000, a second version of the game was released in 2002 under the title BattleSphere Gold, which added new features and improvements compared to the original version and in 2006 a third, one-of-a-kind version titled BattleSphere Trio was auctioned on eBay and has additional features not available on the Gold version. The first copy of the original version was sold on eBay for over US$1500, with the auction proceeds going to diabetes research, while all after-tax profits from subsequently sold copies of every version of the title were invested into diabetes charity.

Despite being published after the platform was discontinued by Atari Corporation in 1996 and being declared as open platform by Hasbro Interactive one year prior to release, BattleSphere received positive reception from reviewers when it launched with praise towards the graphics, music, gameplay, replay value and multiplayer modes, with several publications such as GameFan, Next Generation and Retro Gamer referring it as one of the best games released for the Jaguar. Plans of porting the game to other systems were in consideration but none ever entered into development after several unsuccessful attempts to various publishers.

Gameplay 

BattleSphere is a first-person shooter with space combat simulation elements similar to its main inspiration, Star Raiders, where players assume the role of a pilot representing either of the seven alien races in a fight against each other for the right to control and colonize the galaxy. Every race has three types of ships that players can take control of, each one with their own advantages and weakness. When playing on a single console, the game features four selectable gameplay modes, each one with their own ruleset but players can configurate and adjust options such as the difficulty level of the enemy AI, respawning time, number and types of ships to fight against and more depending on the chosen mode. The network mode features three game modes, with one of the two being only exclusive to this mode and supports up to 16 consoles, each with a pilot and an optional gunner for a potential total of 32 players but the claimed network capability has not been tested, due to the release of the game after Atari Corp. merged with JT Storage in a reverse takeover and the discontinuation of the Jaguar in 1996. The game has 21 ships to choose from, but two other alien races that has their own set of ships, can only be unlocked with cheat codes for a total of 27 ships and each released version of the game features secrets and hidden modes that are also accessed with the same process. Progress, high-score and other settings done by the player are saved automatically via the cartridge's EEPROM. The game also features support for the ProController.

During gameplay and similarly to Descent, players are given full control of their ship in a three-dimensional environment featuring six degrees of freedom on zero gravity, with battles taking place in real-time. Throttle is executed by either holding C and pushing up or down, while pressing 1, 4, 7, or * on the controller's keypad also gives the same result, but holding only C allows the ship to either spin to the left or right. Radar lock-on is done by pressing A and the ship's two radars will keep track of the chosen target until is destroyed and the same process can be done by pressing 3, 6, or 9 on the keypad as well. If either the player or enemy craft is destroyed, their debris can damage or potentially destroy any ship caught in the explosion range. In some cases when a ship is destroyed, the pilot is ejected from the seat and while still capable of fighting against enemy ships, can only withstand one hit before being killed and after being destroyed/killed, players have to wait a set period of time in order to respawn on the playfield. The main weapon on each ship are lasers that can be fired multiple times by pressing B or set their firing function by pressing 2 on the keypad, while other weapons can be toggled by pressing 5 or 8 depending on the type of ship chosen. Every ship also has a MAW sensor, emitting a beeping sound if enemy missiles are approaching.

Modes 
There are five game modes to be found in the game: Alone Against the Empire is an exclusive mode to Single Console inspired by Star Raiders, where players have to command allied spacecraft and protect their starbases in a set of 64 hexagonal quadrant sectors from attacks by an armada of enemy fighters, bombers, superships and obliterate enemy starbases in higher difficulties. In this mode, the 0 and # buttons on the keypad are used for repairing the ship and jump into hyperspace respectively. Gauntlet is an endless mode similar in structure to Missile Command, where the main objective is to defend six starbases in a single sector from a wave of enemies trying to destroy them with each wave increasing in difficulty. Free-For-All is an arcade-style deathmatch mode in vein of Doom and Quake, where players attempts to destroy a set number of starships in order to either reach a fixed number of kills or high score. Pilot Training is a practice mode recommended for beginners and it is a series of 20 training missions in order to be familiarized with the controls and the type of enemies in the game but increases in complexity as players move forward. Battle Sphere is a capture the flag mode exclusive to Network Mode similar to Netrek, where two opposing teams divided across eight consoles attempt to capture or destroy each other's starbases. In addition, there is also a Demo Mode for demonstration purposes.

Plot 
In the future, seven alien races have colonized planets as a necessity rather than choice after exploiting and polluting their original home planets, with war erupting when any of the races meet each other and as result, habitable planets became increasingly rare. Panic between each leader of the seven races led to the decision of confining the hostilities of each other into a small and closed region in space called Sector 51, also known as Battle Sphere, where the seven races send their best pilots to fight in order to claim the right of colonizing planets freely or being confined to their original dying homeworld.

Races 
 O'Catanut
 A feline race that keeps track of the Slith, with rumors of an alliance existing between them that has been suspended for the sake of the event. Their ships focuses on stealth and speed, with one of them resembling the Starfury fighter used by EarthForce, the military branch of the Earth Alliance in Babylon 5 while another is named after the cat from one of the developers.
 Oppressors
 They resemble the concept of demons by the human race and previously controlled most of the galaxy. Most of their ships are designed to reflect that they are an all-male race, with one particular ship bearing resemblance to sperm.
 Se'Bab
 An all-female race that were previously slaves of the Oppressors until the sudden arrival of the Telchines race 50 years ago weakened their hold, as a result, their extreme xenophobia against the other races translates into extremely aggressive and suicidal battle tactics. Some of their ships are named to symbolize their hatred against the Oppressors.
 Slith
 Lizard-like beings and rumored allies of the O'Catanut race, whose ships appear to be alive as some of them are named and based on reptiles, though one of them resembles the Colonial Viper from Battlestar Galactica physically.
 Smg'Heed
 Last surviving descendants of the human race, who were almost wiped out by a scourge of retroviruses and accumulated debt from placing their entire GPP in creating extremely powerful weaponry. As such, all of their fighter crafts are based on previously existing technology from the 20th century. 
 Telchines
 A mysterious race who appeared 50 years ago and are presumed to originate from a neighboring galaxy. The name of their ships always starts with "tri" as the first three letters.
 Thunderbirds
 They are hawk-like predators and rivals of both the O'Catanut and Slith races, blending both speed and firepower into their spacecraft. Their ships are named after birds with one named after the claw of a Bird of prey.

Production

Background 
BattleSphere was originally pitched under the name Singularity to Bill Rehbock, then vice-president in third-party development at Atari Corporation, after Scott Le Grand and Douglas Engel were invited to play some of the first titles for the then-upcoming Atari Jaguar at Glendale, California on September 23, 1993, with Scott suggesting to Bill if they could rename the project to Star Raiders 2000 but he told them that the name was already taken. In October of the same year, Scott and Douglas reached Tom Harker at GEnie, who was looking for programmers to write titles for the upcoming system, to act as an intermediary between them and Atari Corp. Scott convinced his then-fiance Stephanie Wukovitz to compose music for the game and as result, 4Play was formed as a partnership group. 4Play renamed Singularity to Star Battle, in honor of a mainframe computer game Scott wrote during his high school period in the 1980s.

Development 

Development of the game was being handled during the team's leisure, in addition to their full-time jobs and without financial support, estimating that the project would be completed in between 12 and 18 months but encountered several issues along the way, such as the lack of development support from Atari themselves. Star Battle was first showcased to the public at SCES '94 in a non-playable state, with the team originally targeting to release it during Christmas 1994. It was then showcased six months later at WCES '95 in a semi-playable state, under its final name BattleSphere. The game made its last trade show appearance at E3 1995, where 4Play demonstrated the network mode working alongside ICD's CatBox to positive reception, however, it barely made its appearance on the showfloor due to a hardware bug that involved a last-minute rewrite. The game was then slated for a Q2 1995 release and later for a September 1995 release.

From July to September of the same year after being showcased at E3 1995, 4Play went full-time on the development of BattleSphere and at one point, Atari requested a working demo of the game for a focus group session in order to be put in comparison with another upcoming game for the Jaguar, Space War 2000, with Atari shelving the latter in favor of the former after the results from the session. In October of the same year, Atari also requested the team a working network code to be implemented into Iron Soldier 2 for multiplayer, however, this feature was shelved in the final version of the game. It was last previewed by both GamePro and ST Format in 1996. Although 4Play began working on the game modes, Atari folded in January 1996 and the Jaguar was also discontinued, in addition to merging with JT Storage on April 8 of the same year and filing a 10-K405 SEC Form four days later. Even after this event, BattleSphere continued to be developed and was showcased to the public for the first time since 1995 at JagFest '97, a small festival dedicated to the system in Chicago, and in October 1997 the last single-player gameplay mode was implemented into the game.

A group of volunteers tested the game on their free time and as such, BattleSphere was finished in July 1998, almost five years after its conception and was showcased once more at both JagFest '98 in Corfu, New York and World Of Atari in Las Vegas in August of the same year. Though development on the game was completed, 4Play encountered several issues in releasing it with both JT Storage and later Hasbro Interactive, who purchased the remaining brands and other intellectual property rights of Atari Corporation from JT Storage before their bankruptcy in 1999. On May 14, 1999, Hasbro Interactive declared the Atari Jaguar as an open platform and released all the rights to the console into public domain, allowing BattleSphere to be encrypted and released on February 29, 2000, two years after the game was completed. Prior to release, composer Stephanie Wukovitz was interviewed in a 1999 episode of Computer Chronicles, with the game being showcased in the background. It was also briefly mentioned in a special feature article dedicated to the system by German magazine Video Games.

Influences and references 
BattleSphere is influenced by various video games besides Star Raiders such as Doom, Iron Soldier, Netrek, Quake and Star Wars: TIE Fighter. It is also influenced by many science fiction works such as Babylon 5 and Star Trek, with the latter being one of the main sources for the storyline found in the game. In addition, it also features references from other science fiction-based works such as Futurama, The Last Starfighter,, Red Dwarf, among others.

Technical information 
BattleSphere features two-dimensional bitmaps for static images, in addition of using a proprietary polygon rendering engine written by both Scott Le Grand and Douglas Engel, displaying between 10,000 and 15,000 polygons on-screen alongside its own networking code supporting up to 16 players. The game also uses a graphical technique created by 4Play dubbed "Decal-Mapping" for all the gouraud shaded 3D models consisting of 256 polygons each one, in addition of featuring very minimal texture mapping dedicated to the alien races' symbols and identification numbers for multiplayer. It also runs at 60 frames per second, though performance can vary depending on the number of objects displayed on-screen. The game uses a proprietary audio engine featuring six stereo channels for sound effects and four mono channels that are used for in-game music. All of the game's graphics and sound were created on the Atari Falcon. BattleSphere also makes full use of the processors found within the Jaguar for various tasks such as handling of the game's enemy AI and physics engine, with Scott stating that the game was made possible due to the system's multi-chip architecture.

Release 
BattleSphere was first released on February 29, 2000. The first copy of the original version was sold for US$1500 in eBay, with the auction proceeds going to diabetes research. Although the original release and subsequent versions of the game did not originally came bundled with a keypad overlay, they were later produced and released with permission from both co-programmers of the title by community members Gaztee and rubixcube6 at AtariAge forums. Profits from the original and every subsequent version released were invested into charity for diabetes research.

BattleSphere Gold 
A second version of the game, titled BattleSphere Gold, was first released on March 15, 2002. This release came in a transparent cartridge, featuring several updates and additions not found within the original version such as new animations, a reworked menu screen system, bug fixes and more, in addition to containing the JUGS (Jaguar Unmodified Game Server) to aid in homebrew development for the system.

BattleSphere Trio
On June 9, 2006, a third one-of-a-kind version titled BattleSphere Trio was auctioned on eBay, featuring all the previously released content from BattleSphere Gold.

Reception

Before being officially released to the public, Christian Svensson of Next Generation praised the graphics, music, gameplay, controls and multiplayer, stating that "in the end, the wait was worth it. It's too bad that the game will not receive the large audience it deserves." After it was released long after the system was discontinued, no contemporary reviews of BattleSphere were realized with the exception of a brief article by Eric C. Mylonas from GameFan, who pointed the graphics, modes, gameplay and network play as the game's strong points. However, online publications have rated the game positively. Gregory D. George of The Atari Times rated the game positively and praised the graphics, music, sound effects, gameplay and replay value while criticizing the menu and ship selection screens for being hard to read, but he states that "it's a fabulous game and one of the Jaguar's Top 5. I'd even go so far as to say it's one of the Top 20 games of all time." German website neXGam also gave a positive review to the title.

Legacy 
4Play had plans to port BattleSphere into other systems such as the PlayStation and PC if any publisher was interested in backing the project but the idea never happened after several unsuccessful pitches to multiple companies. Scott Le Grand, who later became an employee at VM Labs, also pitched a port of the game to the Nuon but the proposal was rejected.

Notes

References

External links 
 
 BattleSphere at AtariAge
 BattleSphere at GameFAQs
 BattleSphere at MobyGames

2000 video games
Atari Jaguar games
Atari Jaguar-only games
Cancelled PC games
Cancelled PlayStation (console) games
Cooperative video games
First-person shooters
Multiplayer and single-player video games
Post-apocalyptic video games
Science fiction video games
Space combat simulators
Video games developed in the United States
Video games set in the future